Dharwad fort or Mannekilla is a fortress ruin located in the city of Dharwad, Karnataka, India. It has served as entrence for the city during the 1400s. The fort was originally built by Dhar Rao in the year 1403, during the rule of the Vijayanagara Empire under the rulership of Harihara II. The fort is one of the designated sites for the Monuments of National Importance by the Archaeological Survey of India.

History
Dharwad fort was first built by Dhar Rao, an official of the Vijayanagara Empire from the court of Harihara II. It was originally a mud fort when built first. Later in 1573 the fort was captured by the sultan of Bijapur, Adil Shah, and Dharwad was annexed to his dominions. Adil Shah renovated the fort in and later called it Manna Killa, and later NazratabadWith this fort, the strategic importance of Dharwad increased and it attracted the attention of subsequent conquerors, including Aurangzeb, Shivaji, Aurangzeb's son Bahadur Shah I, Peshwa Balaji Baji Rao, Hyder Ali, Tipu Sultan and finally the British colonizers.

In 1685, the fort was taken by the Mughal emperor Aurangzeb, and Dharwad, on the break-up of the Mughal empire, fell under the sway of the Maratha Peshwa of Pune. In 1764, the province was overrun by Hyder Ali of the Mysore, who in 1778 captured the fort of Dharwad. The fort was retaken in 1791 by the Marathas. After the final defeat of the Peshwa by the British in 1818.

References

External links

Forts in Karnataka
Buildings and structures in Dharwad
Tourist attractions in Dharwad